Bronwen Cardy-Wise (born Bronwen Cardy 26 Jan 1952) is a British long-distance runner. She competed in the Half Marathon for Britain at the 1993 IAAF World Half Marathon Championships and was a regular winner of British Half-Marathon races during the 1980s and 1990s. 

Cardy-Wise was a member of Bromsgrove & Redditch Athletic Club. She won many British domestic races during the eighties and nineties which led in 1993 to selection for the IAAF World Half Marathon Championships. In a British team which included Suzanne Rigg, Marian Sutton, Sue Dilnot, Teresa Dyer she finished 59th in a time of 1:16:33.

Cardy-Wise continued running in Masters athletics competition taking part in the 2001 World Masters Athletics Championships in Brisbane while working as a Prison officer.  She came second in the W45 1500m in 4:56.24, winning both the 5000m in 17:34.37 and 10000m in 36:20.10.

Road Racing Competition Record

References

External links 
 
 
 

1952 births
Living people
British female long-distance runners
British female marathon runners
Sportspeople from Redditch
Welsh female long-distance runners
Welsh female marathon runners